YNL or ynl may refer to:

 YNL, the IATA code for Points North Landing Airport, Saskatchewan, Canada
 ynl, the ISO 639-3 code for Yangulam language, Madang Province, Papua New Guinea